37 1/2 is a 2005 Norwegian comedy-drama film directed by Vibeke Idsøe, starring Helén Vikstvedt. Selma (Vikstvedt) is a journalist in her late 30s, having a mid-life crisis.

References

External links
 
 37 1/2 at Filmweb.no

2005 films
2005 comedy-drama films
Norwegian comedy-drama films